Rolando Crisostomo Santos (born March 21, 1949 in Malabon) is a Filipino clergyman and bishop for the Roman Catholic Diocese of Alotau-Sideia. He was appointed bishop in 2011.

References

1949 births
Filipino Roman Catholic bishops
Roman Catholic bishops of Alotau-Sideia
Living people
People from Malabon
21st-century Filipino Roman Catholic priests